The Jeff Tweedy discography covers albums that he has recorded with Uncle Tupelo, Wilco, solo albums, and various side projects.

Discography

Solo albums

Soundtracks

Singles

Other appearances

Session work

Albums

Appearances

Videography

Band work

Uncle Tupelo

Wilco

Golden Smog

Loose Fur

The Minus 5

Tweedy

References

Discographies of American artists
Rock music discographies
Country music discographies